The 2014 season is the 119th year in the club's history, the 103rd season in Clube de Regatas do Flamengo's football existence, and their 44th in the Brazilian Série A, having never been relegated from the top division.

Club

First-team staff
As of August 12, 2014.

Other information

First-team squad

Players with Dual Nationality
   Lucas Mugni
   Eduardo da Silva
   Mattheus
   Paulo Victor

Out on loan

Transfers

In

Out

Statistics

Appearances and goals
Last updated on January 5, 2015.
 Players in italic have left the club during the season.

|}

Top scorers
Includes all competitive matches

Clean sheets
Includes all competitive matches

Disciplinary record

Overview

Competitions

Campeonato Carioca

First phase (Taça Guanabara)

Matches

Semifinals

Final

Copa do Brasil

Round of 16

Quarterfinals

Semifinals

Average attendances
Includes all home matches in the 2014 Copa do Brasil.

Série A

League table

Results summary

Pld=Matches played; W=Matches won; D=Matches drawn; L=Matches lost;

Results by round

Average attendances
Includes all home matches in the 2014 Série A.

Matches

Copa Libertadores

Standings

Average attendances
Includes all home matches in the 2014 Copa Libertadores.

Matches

References

External links
 Clube de Regatas do Flamengo
 Flamengo official website (in Portuguese)

Brazilian football clubs 2014 season
CR Flamengo seasons